Pakistan will participate in the 2021 Islamic Solidarity Games to be held in Konya, Turkey from 9 to 18 August 2022, the Games were rescheduled from 20 to 29 August 2021 however the event was postponed to be held from 10 to 19 September 2021 in July 2020 by the ISSF because the original dates were coinciding with the 2020 Summer Olympics, which were postponed due to the COVID-19 pandemic. In May 2021, the ISSF postponed the event to August 2022 citing the COVID-19 pandemic situation in the participating countries.

Athletes and Officials
A total of 114 athletes and officials were sent to participate in these Games. Archery, athletics, fencing, gymnastics, judo, shooting, swimming, table tennis, taekwondo, volleyball, weightlifting and wrestling are some of the sports being competed in. Ahmad Hanif Orakzai was the Chef de Mission for the Pakistani team in Konya.

Medalists

| width="78%" align="left" valign="top" |

| width="22%" align="left" valign="top" |

Archery 

Pakistan has sent a team of five athletes, two men and three women:

 Abdur Rehman Hafiz
 Muhammad Noman Saqib
 Umme Kulsoom
 Sadia Mai
 Kiran Muhammad
Recurve

Athletics 

Men
Track and road events

Field Events

Women
Track and road events

Para-Athletics

Fencing 

Pakistan has sent a single fencer, The sole Pakistani fencer was eliminated in the first round of the Men's Epee event.

 Mujaded Awan

Gymnastics 

Pakistan has fielded a team of 3 male gymnasts;

 Muhammad Afzal
 Shah Jahan Barkat
 Muhammad Sohail

Judo 

The team consists of three male judokas;

 Qaiser Khan
 Haseeb Mustafa
 Shah Hussain Shah

Karate 

The contingent consists of six athletes, 4 men and 2 women;

 Saadi Ghulam Abbas
 Naseer Ahmed
 Imran Ali
 Murad Khan
 Sana Kousar
 Fakhar-un-Nisa

Swimming 

Pakistan has sent a team of six swimmers;

 Mishael Aisha Hayat Ayub
 Bisma Khan
 Fatima Adnan Lotia
 Daniyal Ghulam Nabi
 Jehanara Nabi
 Muhammad Amaan Siddiqui
Results

Shooting 

Pakistan has sent a team of six male shooters;

 Usman Chand
 Zafar Ul Haq
 Khurram Inam
 Asif Mehmood
 Muhammad Farrukh Nadeem
 Amin Ullah

Table Tennis

Taekwondo 

Pakistan has sent a team of eleven athletes, seven men and four women;

 Mazhar Abbas
 Wajid Ali
 Naqsh Hamdani
 Muhammad Iqbal
 Haroon Khan
 Muhammad Arbaz Khan
 Hamzah Omar Saeed
 Fateemah Tuz Zahraa Khawar
 Noor Rehman
 Sara Rehman
 Zoya Sabir

Volleyball

Men's tournament
Team Roster

Pool B

|}

Weightlifting 

Three weightlifters will represent Pakistan:

 Muhammad Nooh Dastgir Butt
 Hanzala Dastgir Butt
 Haider Ali

Wrestling 

Muhammad Inam withdrew from the Games after sustaining a knee injury during the Commonwealth Games held in July/August 2022 in Birmingham, UK. The wrestling team consists of:

 Muhammad Bilal
 Haider Ali Butt
 Muhammad Asad Butt
 Inayat Ullah
Key:

 F – Victory by fall.
 PP – Decision by points – the loser with technical points.
 PO – Decision by points – the loser without technical points.
 ST – Great superiority – the loser without technical points and a margin of victory of at least 8 (Greco-Roman) or 10 (freestyle) points.

Freestyle

References

External links
Pakistan Olympic Association Official site

Nations at the 2021 Islamic Solidarity Games
2021
2022 in Pakistani sport